Bifengxia Giant Panda Base is a giant panda research and breeding facility in Bifengxia Town, Ya'an, Sichuan, China. Since opening in 2004, it has become home to several more giant pandas.  This includes the U.S.-born Hua Mei and Mei Sheng, who were relocated there after the May 12, 2008, Sichuan earthquake severely damaged the panda breeding center at the Wolong National Nature Reserve.  Both facilities are managed by the China Conservation and Research Center for the Giant Panda.

The Vienna Zoo-born male panda Fu Long (b. 2007) was relocated to Bifengxia in November, 2009.  On February 5, 2010, Bifengxia became home to Tai Shan, who was born at the National Zoo in Washington D.C. Later that year, Su Lin and Zhen Zhen from the San Diego Zoo were also moved here.

In 2008, there were 13 baby pandas surviving in the Bifengxia Base. On February 12, 2009, the base held a simple ceremony for these small ones as they attended the panda kindergarten. The giant pandas, who temporarily lived in the Bifengxia Base, returned to the Wolong National Nature Reserve after its restoration that took between two or three years.

See also 

 Chengdu Research Base of Giant Panda Breeding, also in Sichuan

References

Giant pandas
Nature conservation in China
Zoos in China
Buildings and structures in Sichuan
2004 establishments in China